Anthony Thomas Grafton (born May 21, 1950) is an American historian of early modern Europe and the Henry Putnam University Professor of History at Princeton University, where he is also the Director the Program in European Cultural Studies. He is also a corresponding fellow of the British Academy and a recipient of the Balzan Prize.  From January 2011 to January 2012, he served as the President of the American Historical Association. From 2006 to 2020, Grafton was co-executive editor of the Journal of the History of Ideas.

Early life and education
Grafton was born on May 21, 1950, in New Haven, Connecticut. He was educated at Phillips Academy (Andover).

He attended the University of Chicago, from which he graduated with a Bachelor of Arts degree in history in 1971 and a Master of Arts degree in 1972. He made Phi Beta Kappa in 1970, with honors in history and in the college. After studying at University College, London, under ancient historian Arnaldo Momigliano, from 1973 to 1974, he earned his Doctor of Philosophy degree in history from the University of Chicago in 1975. He still retains links with the University of London's Warburg Institute.

Grafton married Louise Erlich in 1972, and was married to her until her death in 2019. They had two children.

Career
After a brief period teaching at Cornell's history department, he was appointed to a position at Princeton University in 1975, where he has subsequently remained. In 2006, he became co-editor of the Journal of the History of Ideas, together with Warren Breckman, Martin Burke, and Ann Moyer.

Works
Anthony Grafton is noted for his studies of the classical tradition from the Renaissance to the eighteenth century, and in the history of historical scholarship. His many books include a study of the scholarship and chronology of Renaissance scholar Joseph Scaliger (2 vols, 1983–1993), and, more recently, studies of Girolamo Cardano as an astrologer (1999) and Leon Battista Alberti (2000). In 1996, he delivered the Triennial E. A. Lowe Lectures at Corpus Christi College, University of Oxford, speaking on Ancient History in Early Modern Europe. Together with Lisa Jardine, he also co-wrote a revisionist account of the significance of Renaissance education (From Humanism to the Humanities, 1986) and on the marginalia of Gabriel Harvey.

He also penned several essay collections, including Defenders of the Text (1991), which deals with the relations between scholarship and science in the early modern period, and, most recently, Worlds Made by Words. His most original and accessible book is The Footnote: A Curious History (1997; published in German as Die Tragischen Ursprünge der deutschen Fußnote), a case study of how the marginal footnote developed as a central and powerful tool in the hands of historians.

He also writes on a wide variety of topics for The New Republic, The American Scholar, and The New York Review of Books. He owns a bookwheel which he keeps at hand in his home.

Honors
 Los Angeles Times Book Prize, History, 1993
 Member of the American Philosophical Society, elected 1993
 Balzan Prize for History of the Humanities, 2002
Member of the American Academy of Arts and Sciences, elected 2002 
Fellow of The British Academy, elected 1997
 Honorary degree from Leiden University, 2006
 Honorary degree from University of Oxford, 2013
 The Sigmund H. Danziger, Jr. Memorial Lecture in the Humanities, University of Chicago, 2011
 Rome Prize
 Pour le Mérite
 Guggenheim Fellowship
 Berlin-Brandenburg Academy of Sciences and Humanities

Selected publications

Articles
 Grafton, Anthony. "The History of Ideas: Precept and Practice, 1950–2000 and Beyond". Journal of the History of Ideas 67#1 (2006): 1–32. online

Books
Joseph Scaliger: A Study in the History of Classical Scholarship, Oxford-Warburg Studies (Oxford: Oxford University Press, 1983–1993).
with Lisa Jardine, From Humanism to the Humanities. Education and the Liberal Arts in Fifteenth- and Sixteenth-Century Europe (London: Duckworth, 1986). 
Forgers and Critics. Creativity and Duplicity in Western Scholarship (Princeton: Princeton University Press, 1990).
Defenders of the Text: The Traditions of Scholarship in the Age of Science, 1450–1800 (Cambridge, Massachusetts: Harvard University Press, 1991).
New Worlds, Ancient Texts: The Power of Tradition and the Shock of Discovery (Cambridge, Massachusetts: Harvard University Press, 1995).
Commerce with the Classics: Ancient Books and Renaissance Readers (Ann Arbor: University of Michigan Press, 1997).
The Footnote: A Curious History (Cambridge, Massachusetts: Harvard University Press, 1997).
Cardano's Cosmos : The Worlds and Works of a Renaissance Astrologer (Cambridge, Massachusetts: Harvard University Press, 1999).
Leon Battista Alberti: Master Builder of the Italian Renaissance (Cambridge, Massachusetts: Harvard University Press, 2000).
Bring Out Your Dead: The Past as Revelation (Cambridge, Massachusetts: Harvard University Press, 2001).
What Was History?: The Art of History in Early Modern Europe (Cambridge: Cambridge University Press, 2006).
with Megan Hale Williams, Christianity and the Transformation of the Book: Origen, Eusebius, and the Library of Caesarea (Cambridge, Massachusetts: Harvard University Press, 2006).
Codex in Crisis (New York: The Crumpled Press, 2008). Video: , Authors@Google, February 12, 2009.
with Brian A. Curran, Pamela O. Long, and Benjamin Weiss, Obelisk: A History (Cambridge, Massachusetts: Burndy Library and MIT Press, 2009).
Worlds Made by Words (Cambridge, Massachusetts: Harvard University Press, 2009). Review by Véronique Krings, Bryn Mawr Classical Review 2009.09.32
(with Joanna Weinberg), "I Have Always Loved the Holy Tongue": Isaac Casaubon, The Jews, and a Forgotten Chapter in Renaissance Scholarship (Cambridge, Massachusetts: Harvard University Press, 2011).
Inky Fingers: The Making of Books in Early Modern Europe (Cambridge, Massachusetts: Harvard University Press, 2020).
with Maren Elisabeth Schwab, The Art of Discovery: Digging into the Past in Renaissance Europe (Princeton University Press, 2022).

Essays
Anthony Grafton at The New York Review of Books

References

External links

 Grafton's Publication List
 YouTube videos:
 
  ("Life on the Burning Deck: Defending the Humanities in the 21st Century", a lecture delivered at the University of New Hampshire on November 1, 2010)
 
 
 
 
 
 
 
 
  (April 2, 2009, Lorenz Eitner Lecture delivered by Anthony Grafton)
 

1950 births
Living people
21st-century American historians
American male non-fiction writers
Cornell University Department of History faculty
Historians of antiquity
Historians of science
People associated with the Warburg Institute
Princeton University faculty
University of Chicago alumni
Recipients of the Pour le Mérite (civil class)
Corresponding Fellows of the British Academy
Historians of the Renaissance
21st-century American male writers
Members of the American Philosophical Society